The Cumberland Phoenix football team represents Cumberland University in National Association of Intercollegiate Athletics (NAIA), primarily competing in the Mid-South Conference. The Phoenix formerly competed in the TranSouth Athletic Conference and Southern Intercollegiate Athletic Association.

History
Cumberland football began on October 26, 1894 with a 6–6 tie with Peabody and finished that first year with a 2–1–1 season record. 

The early days of Cumberland football were very promising. The 1901 team played three games, with one recorded loss, but the following year, the 1902 team had a 3-5 record, with a victory over Mississippi A&M (now Mississippi State University). 

The pinnacle of the early days of CU football was the 1903 team. The season that began with a (6–0) win over Vanderbilt then a (0–6) loss to Sewanee and continued with a five-day road trip with victories over Alabama (44–0) November 14, 1903, LSU (41–0) November 16, 1903, and Tulane (28–0) November 18, 1903. Cumberland would play a postseason game against Coach John Heisman's Clemson team on Thanksgiving Day that ended in an 11–11 tie and a record of 4–1–1  which gave Coach A. L. Phillips and Cumberland University the Championship of the Southern Intercollegiate Athletic Association. 

The 1904 team went 3-1, a victory over Mississippi A&M (now Mississippi State University). The 1905 team had a 3-4 record, with victories over Georgia and Ole Miss.

The 1916 game against Georgia Tech is famous as the most lopsided-scoring game in the history of college football; Georgia Tech defeated Cumberland by a score of 222–0.

In 2001, Jacksonville State University Gamecocks placekicker Ashley Martin became the first woman to play and score in an NCAA Division I American football game when she kicked an extra point in the first quarter of a game against Cumberland University.

For the 2008 season, CU's football earned a share of the Mid-South Conference West Division.

In 2016, the team changed its name from Bulldogs to the Phoenix.

Conference championships

Notable individual achievements 
Cumberland Athletics Hall of Fame
Joe Black Hayes
Garland Morrow
Thug Murray
Red Smith

All-Southerns

1903: J. C. Anderson, halfback
1903: Marvin O. Bridges, guard
1903: Red Smith, center
1904: Willard Steele, halfback
1905: Red Smith, center

References

External links
 

 
American football teams established in 1894
1894 establishments in Tennessee